Lachlan Walmsley (born 12 June 1998) is a Scotland international rugby league footballer who plays as a er and  for the Halifax Panthers in the Betfred Championship.

He previously played for Whitehaven in Betfred League 1.

Background
Walmsley was born in Merriwa, New South Wales, Australia. He is of Scottish descent.

Playing career

Club career
He came through the youth system at the Newcastle Knights and reserve grade for the South Sydney Rabbitohs, and played for New South Wales under 18s in the State of Origin at youth level.

Walmsley was the top point scorer for Whitehaven in their 2021 season.

He joined Halifax ahead of the 2022 season and was the top try-scorer for the Panthers in their 2022 season.

International career
In 2021 Walmsley made his international début for Scotland against Jamaica.

References

External links
Halifax Panthers profile
Scotland profile
Scotland RL profile

1998 births
Living people
Australian rugby league players
Australian people of Scottish descent
Rugby league fullbacks
Rugby league players from New South Wales
Rugby league wingers
Halifax R.L.F.C. players
Scotland national rugby league team players
Whitehaven R.L.F.C. players